Vamuna is a genus of moths in the subfamily Arctiinae. The genus was erected by Frederic Moore in 1878.

Species
 Vamuna bipars Moore, 1878
 Vamuna maculata Moore, 1878
 Vamuna remelana Moore, [1866]
 Vamuna virilis Rothschild, 1913

References

 
Heteroneura genera